is a compilation album by Japanese entertainer Akina Nakamori, released through Universal Music Japan on August 6, 2014. The album compiles the singles and select tracks from Nakamori's Utahime cover album series. It was later combined with All Time Best: Original in the four-disc compilation All Time Best: Original & Cover on December 3, 2014.

The album was released in regular and first-press editions. The limited edition includes the DVD release of the NHK special .

Charting performance
The album debuted at No. 7 on Oricon's weekly albums chart and charted for 30 weeks.

Track listing

Charts

References

External links
 
 
 

2014 compilation albums
Akina Nakamori compilation albums
Japanese-language compilation albums
Universal Music Japan compilation albums